David Wilson (September 17, 1818 – June 9, 1870) was an American lawyer, writer and politician from New York. He is best known for his role in publishing  Twelve Years a Slave, as told to him by Solomon Northup, in 1853.

Early life
David Wilson was born on September 17, 1818, in West Hebron, Washington County, New York. He attended Salem Washington Academy in Salem, New York. Wilson graduated from Union College in 1840. Then he studied law, with future state senator Orville Clark, and was admitted to the bar in 1843.

Law and politics
He practiced law in Whitehall. He was a Whig member of the New York State Assembly in 1852. In 1857, he was appointed as Deputy New York State Treasurer, and moved permanently to Albany. He was Clerk of the New York State Assembly from January 26, 1858, to January 4, 1859, officiating in the 81st New York State Legislature. At this time he was a member of the American Party. He was Deputy Clerk of the New York Court of Appeals from 1860 to 1862.

Author
After some time he abandoned the practice of law due to poor health, and engaged in literary pursuits, writing books on historical subjects.

Twelve Years a Slave
Wilson is best known for editing Solomon Northup's Twelve Years a Slave (1853). He met Northup through Orville Clark, who provided an affidavit for Northrup and circulated and signed a petition that helped free him. In the preface of the book, Wilson states that he corrected "numerous faults of style and of expression" and corrected discrepancies in the tale.

Wilson stated that he had not intended for the book to be as long as it became. Northup had wanted to include a lot of details that may not be critical to the telling of the story, but made it an important historical account of life on several plantations and the cruelty they endured. A group of Union soldiers who had earlier read the book met Northrup's enslaver Edwin Epps during the Civil War. Epps told them that "a greater part of the book was truth."

Wilson clearly states that he had no objective beyond that of an editor in publishing the book. 
He was not an abolitionist who would actively seek the elimination of slavery. Politically, he was affiliated with the American Party, which did not have a stance for or against slavery. In the book's preface, Wilson states:

Other historical subjects
Wilson wrote other books about historical subjects:
 Life in Whitehall: A Tale of the Ship Fever Times (1849), a collection of newspaper articles on Whitehall during a typhus outbreak. 
The Life of Jane McCrea: With an Account of Burgoyne’s Expedition in 1777 (1853), a biography of Jane McCrea. 
Henrietta Robinson (1855) about Mrs. Henrietta Robinson, known as the veiled murderess, who was sentenced to be hanged on August 3, 1855, at Troy, New York, for a murder.

Later life and death
In his later years, Wilson was part-owner of a brewery. He died on June 9, 1870 in Albany, New York, and was buried at the New Hebron Cemetery in Hebron.

Notes

References

External links

1818 births
1870 deaths
People from Hebron, New York
New York (state) Whigs
19th-century American politicians
New York (state) Know Nothings
American male writers
Members of the New York State Assembly
People from Whitehall, New York
Clerks of the New York State Assembly
Union College (New York) alumni